This is a list of notable Austrians.

Actors/actresses
 Helmut Berger (born 1944), actor
 Senta Berger (born 1941), actress
 Klaus Maria Brandauer (born 1943), actor
 Marie Geistinger (1836–1903), actress and opera singer
 Gilla (born 1950), also known as Gisela Wuchinger; singer and actor from the disco era
 Käthe Gold (1907–1997), stage actress
 Liane Haid (1895–2000), first Austrian movie star
 Attila Hörbiger (1896–1987), actor
 Christiane Hörbiger (1938–2022), actress
 Paul Hörbiger (1894–1981), actor
 Boris Kodjoe (born 1973), actor
 Melanie Kogler (born 1985), television and theatre actress
 Hedy Lamarr (1914–2000), actress; also co-inventor of spread spectrum radio technology; became U.S. citizen
 Karl Merkatz (1930–2022), actor (most notable for his role as a Viennese in "Mundl")
 Birgit Minichmayr (born 1977), actress
 Hans Moser (1880–1964), comedy actor
 Reggie Nalder (1907–1991), actor
 Maximilian Schell (1930–2014), actor
 Arnold Schwarzenegger (born 1947), bodybuilder, actor, became U.S. citizen, governor of the U.S. state of California (2003–2011)
 Erich von Stroheim (1885–1957), actor and film director
 Christoph Waltz (born 1956), actor
 Maria Weiss, mezzo-soprano and actress
 Oskar Werner (1922–1984), actor

Artists/architects

 Felix de Weldon, sculptor
 Maria Auböck, landscape architect
 Bernhard Cella, conceptual artist
 Karl Duldig (1902–1986), Austrian-Australian sculptor
 Albin Egger-Lienz, painter
 Karl Ehn, architect, designer of the Karl-Marx-Hof
 Trude Fleischmann, photographer
 Ernst Fuchs, artist
 Xenia Hausner, painter
 Gottfried Helnwein, artist, born in Vienna
 Kurt Hentschlager, new media artist
 Friedensreich Hundertwasser, artist
 Gustav Klimt, artist, helped found Vienna Secession
 Oskar Kokoschka, painter
 Alfred Kubin, graphic artist
 Adolf Loos, architect, born in Brno (Moravia, present-day Czech Republic)
 Hans Makart, history painter, designer and decorator
 Inge Morath, photographer
 Richard Neutra, architect
 Willy Puchner, photographer
 Arnulf Rainer, painter
 Johann Michael Rottmayr, Baroque painter
 Egon Schiele, painter
 Margarete Schütte-Lihotzky, architect and political activist
 De Es Schwertberger, artist
 Harry Seidler, architect
 Aloys Wach, painter
 Otto Wagner, Jugendstil architect behind much of turn-of-the-century Viennese architecture
 Ferdinand Georg Waldmüller, painter
 Franz West, artist
 Olga Wisinger-Florian, painter

Composers/musicians

 Wolfgang Ambros, pop musician
 Louie Austen (born 1946), composer and musician
 Ernst Bachrich (1892/1893–1942), composer and conductor
 Caroline Bayer (1758–1803), 18th-century violinist and composer
 Alban Berg (1885–1935), composer
 Alfred Brendel (born 1931), pianist
 Anton Bruckner (1824–1896), composer
 Friedrich Cerha (1926–2023), composer and conductor
 Carl Czerny (1791–1857), pianist and composer
 Anton Diabelli (1781–1858), publisher, editor and composer
 Carl Ditters von Dittersdorf (1739–1799), composer
 Karlheinz Essl (born 1960), composer and electronical musician
 Falco (1957–1998), pop musician
 Christian Fennesz (born 1962), electronic musician
 Bernhard Gál (born 1971), composer and artist
 Georg Friedrich Haas (born 1953), composer
 Natascha Hagen, singer-songwriter
 Nikolaus Harnoncourt (1929–2016), conductor
 Joseph Haydn (1732–1809), composer
 Michael Haydn (1737–1806), composer, younger brother of Joseph Haydn
 Udo Jürgens (1934–2014), singer-songwriter
 Herbert von Karajan (1908–1989), conductor
 Bernhard Lang (born 1957), composer
 Thomas Lang (born 1967), drummer and composer
 Joseph Lanner (1801–1843), composer
 Left Boy (born 1988), singer 
 Elisabeth Leonskaja (born 1945), pianist, Austrian Cross of Honour for Science and Art, First Class, in 2006
 Gustav Mahler (1860–1911), composer
 Penny McLean (born 1948), singer with the disco group Silver Convention
 Marianne von Martinez (1744–1812), composer, singer
 Wolfgang Amadeus Mozart (1756–1791), musician and composer
 Gerhard Potuznik, electronic musician
 Franz Schmidt (1874–1939), composer
 Arnold Schoenberg (1874–1951), composer
 Franz Schubert (1797–1828), composer and musician
 Parov Stelar (born 1974), electronic musician
 Eduard Strauss (1835–1916), composer
 Johann Strauss Jr. (1825–1899), composer
 Johann Strauss Sr. (1804–1849), composer
 Josef Strauss (1827–1870), composer
 Franz von Suppé (1819–1895), composer
 Anton Webern (1883–1945), composer
 Franz Welser-Möst (born 1960), conductor
 Hugo Wolf (1860–1903), composer
 Conchita Wurst (born 1988), pop musician
 Joe Zawinul (1932–2007), jazz musician, composer
 Eric Zeisl (1905–1959), composer
 Alexander von Zemlinsky (1871–1942), composer

Entrepreneurs
 Hannes Androsch (born 1938), former minister of finance in the government of Bruno Kreisky
Hikmet Ersek, CEO of The Western Union Company, a Fortune 500 company.  
 Ignaz Glaser (1853–1916), entrepreneur
 Gaston Glock (born 1929), inventor, founder of Glock Ges.m.b.H.
 Niki Lauda (1949–2019), Formula One race car driver and aviation entrepreneur
 Richard Lugner (born 1932), entrepreneur and society figure
 Dietrich Mateschitz (1944–2022), businessman behind the Red Bull brand
 Ludwig (Louis) von Nathaniel (1882–1955), banker
 Ferdinand Porsche, automotive engineer, designed the Volkswagen (the "people's car"), born in Vratislavice nad Nisou (Austria-Hungary, Bohemia, present-day Czech Republic), (1875–1951)
 Ferdinand Anton Ernst Porsche, automotive engineer and entrepreneur, he expanded the sports car manufacturer Porsche AG to what it is now (1909–1998)
 Johann Puch (1862–1914), inventor, mechanic, co-founder of Steyr-Daimler-Puch
 Albert Salomon von Rothschild (1844–1911), banker
 Anselm von Rothschild (1803–1874), banker
 Ferdinand James von Rothschild (1839–1898), investor
 Nathaniel Mayer Anselm von Rothschild (1836–1905), banker
 Salomon Mayer von Rothschild (1774–1855), banker
 Robert Schlumberger (1814–1879), entrepreneur
 Frank Stronach (born 1932), (born in Austria), entrepreneur
 Daniel Swarovski (1862–1956), founder of Swarovski AG, world-famous crystals, born in Jiřetín pod Bukovou, (Bohemia, present-day Czech Republic)

Filmmakers

 Barbara Albert, film director, producer and writer
 Franz Antel, director, actor and writer
 Axel Corti, director
 Elfi von Dassanowsky, film producer, singer, pianist
 Andrea Maria Dusl, film director and writer
 Amir Esmann, director, director of photography, writer
 Max Fleischer, animator 
 Michael Haneke, film director (born in Germany, however lives and works in Austria)
 Fritz Lang, film director
 Francis Lawrence, Austrian-American film director
 Otto Preminger, film director
 Stefan Ruzowitzky, film director and writer
 Arnold Schwarzenegger, actor and politician
 Ulrich Seidl, film director and writer
 Josef von Sternberg, film director
 Erich von Stroheim, film director
 Wolfgang Suschitzky, director of photography
 Edgar G. Ulmer, film director
 Hans Weingartner, film director, producer and writer
 Virgil Widrich, film director, producer and writer
 Billy Wilder, film director, born in Austria-Hungary
 Fred Zinnemann, film director

Mountaineers

 Peter Aufschnaiter, mountaineer and co-traveller of Heinrich Harrer (Seven Years in Tibet)
 Karl Blodig, mountaineer (first to climb all alpine mountains above 4000 m)
 Hermann Buhl, first ascent of Nanga Parbat on the 1953 German–Austrian Nanga Parbat expedition, first ascent of Broad Peak
 Kurt Diemberger, first ascents of Broad Peak (1957) and Dhaulagiri (1960)
 Peter Habeler, first ascent of Mount Everest without oxygen (together with Reinhold Messner)
 Heinrich Harrer, mountaineer (first ascent of the Carstensz Pyramid) and writer (Seven Years in Tibet)
 Gerlinde Kaltenbrunner, first woman to ascend all eight-thousanders without oxygen (2011)
Fritz Moravec, first ascent of Gasherbrum II (1956)
 Ludwig Purtscheller, first ascent of Kilimanjaro in 1889
 Marcus Schmuck, first ascent of Broad Peak in 1957 as expedition leader
 Herbert Tichy, geologist, journalist and mountaineer (first ascent of Cho Oyu)
 Luis Trenker, mountaineer, film director and writer (born in the southern part of Tyrol then Austrian-Hungarian)
 Fritz Wintersteller, first ascent of Broad Peak in 1957

Military leaders

 Haim Bar-Lev, Israeli general and government minister
 Leopold Josef Graf Daun, field marshal
 Joseph Radetzky von Radetz, military leader
 Prince Eugene of Savoy, general in the war against the Turks (17th–18th century)
 Philipp von Stadion und Thannhausen, field marshal 
 Wilhelm von Tegetthoff, admiral
 Georg von Trapp, navy officer
 Alfred I, Prince of Windisch-Grätz, general
 Archduke Charles of Austria, fought against Napoleon

Politicians

Kasimir Felix Graf Badeni, statesman and diplomat
Leopold Graf Berchtold, foreign minister at the outbreak of the First World War
Brigitte Bierlein, Chancellor 2019–2020
Richard von Coudenhove-Kalergi, politician and writer
Engelbert Dollfuß, Chancellor 1932–1934 (First Republic), established Austrofascism
Leopold Figl, Chancellor 1945–1953, foreign minister 1953–1959
Heinz Fischer, former President
Werner Faymann, former Chancellor
Jörg Haider, politician, governour of Carinthia until his death in 2008
Adolf Hitler, leader of Nazi Germany 1933–1945, gained German citizenship in 1932, and became German Chancellor in 1933. In 1938, he annexed Austria with the Anschluß
Joseph Hormayr Freiherr zu Hortenburg, statesman and historian
Theodor Innitzer, cardinal archbishop of Vienna 1932–1955, minister of social affairs 1929–1930
Ernst Kaltenbrunner, NSDAP politician
Wenzel Anton Graf Kaunitz, statesman
Christian Kern, Chancellor 2016–2017
Rudolf Kirchschläger, judge, diplomat and President 1974–1986
Thomas Klestil, diplomat, President 1992–2004
Teddy Kollek, Israeli Mayor of Jerusalem
Bruno Kreisky, Chancellor 1970–1983, foreign minister 1959–1966
Sebastian Kurz, Chancellor 2017–2019, 2020–2021
Klemens Wenzel von Metternich, diplomat and statesman
Julius Raab, Chancellor 1953–1961
Karl Renner, Chancellor 1918–1920 and 1945, first President of the Second Republic 1945–1950
Adolf Schärf, President 1957–1965
Anton von Schmerling, statesman (liberal movement of the 19th century)
Kurt Schuschnigg, Chancellor 1934–1938
Wolfgang Schüssel, Chancellor 2000–2007
Arnold Schwarzenegger, former governor of California
Ignaz Seipel, Catholic priest, Chancellor 1922–1924 and 1926–1929
Arthur Seyß-Inquart, NSDAP politician, last Chancellor before the Anschluss in 1938
Johann Philipp von Stadion, statesman, foreign minister and diplomat 1763–1824
Alexander Van der Bellen, former chairman of the Austrian Green Party and President since 2017
Kurt Waldheim, diplomat and politician, UN Secretary-General 1972–1982, President of Austria 1986–1992

Religious leaders

Theodor Innitzer, cardinal archbishop of Vienna 1932–1955, minister of social affairs 1929–1930
Franz König, 1905–2004, Cardinal Archbishop of Vienna (1956–1985)
Christoph Schönborn, archbishop and cardinal
Ignaz Seipel, Catholic priest, Chancellor 1922–1924 and 1926–1929

Royalty

Elisabeth, Empress-Consort of Austria, wife of Francis Joseph I
Ferdinand I, Emperor of Austria
Francis Joseph I, Emperor of Austria
Francis II/I, Holy Roman Emperor, first Emperor of Austria
Franz Ferdinand, Archduke (assassinated in 1914)
Frederick II of Austria, last Babenberger duke of Austria
Joseph II, Holy Roman Emperor, reformer (abolished the death penalty) 1780–1790
Karl I, last Emperor of Austria
Karl V, Holy Roman Emperor 1500–1558
Leopold V, Babenberg duke of Austria, participated in the Third Crusade
Maria Leopoldina, Archduchess, became Empress of Brazil
Maria Theresia, Archduchess of Austria, Holy Roman Empress-Consort, last male-line Habsburg
Marie Antoinette, Archduchess, became Queen of France
Maximilian I, Holy Roman Emperor, 1459–1519
Maximilian I, Emperor of Mexico, Archduke of Austria
Rudolf, Crown Prince of Austria,  Archduke of Austria
Rudolph I, King of Germany, first Habsburg king
Rudolf IV of Austria, Duke of Austria, self-styled archduke 1358–1365 (Privilegium Maius)

Scientists

Economists
Eugen von Böhm-Bawerk, economist and early member of the Austrian School of Economics
Friedrich Hayek, economist and social scientist, Bank of Sweden Prize in Economic Sciences in Memory of Alfred Nobel 1974 (became a British citizen in 1938)
Leopold Kohr (1909–1994), economist, jurist and political scientist
Fritz Machlup
Carl Menger, founder of the Austrian School of economics
Ludwig von Mises, free-market economist
Oskar Morgenstern, co-founder of game theory
Otto Neurath, socialist, economist and philosopher
Joseph Schumpeter, economist, born in Triesch Austria-Hungary
Friedrich von Wieser, economist of the Austrian School

Engineers/inventors

Thomas Feichtner, industrial designer
Anselm Franz, pioneer in jet engine engineering, designed the world's first turbojet
Gaston Glock, inventor, founder of firearms company GLOCK GmbH
Eduard Haas, inventor of the Pez candy
Hedy Lamarr, co-inventor of spread spectrum wireless communications, along with George Antheil
Viktor Kaplan, inventor of turbines for river power plants
Wilhelm Kress, aviation pioneer, inventor of the stick control for airplanes
Alexander Habianitsch, certified wheelchair virtuoso 
Ernst Lauda (1859–1932), hydraulic and bridge engineer
Josef Madersperger, invented the sewing machine in 1818
Siegfried Marcus, automobile pioneer, inventor of the first gasoline powered automobile (vehicles of 1870 and 1889)
Alois Negrelli, engineer and railroad pioneer (created the plans for the Suez Canal)
Ferdinand Porsche, automotive engineer, designed the Volkswagen (the "people's car"), inventor of the hybrid car, contributed to the design of the Tiger I and Tiger II tanks. Born in Austria-Hungary
Josef Ressel, inventor of the marine screw propeller, pneumatic post and ball bearing
Alois Senefelder, inventor of the printing technique of lithography
 Josef Singer (1923–2009), Israeli aeronautical engineer and President of Technion – Israel Institute of Technology
Max Valier, rocketry pioneer
Auer von Welsbach, inventor of gaslight
Theodor Scheimpflug, inventor of Scheimpflug photography

Philosophers

Franz Brentano, philosopher and psychologist
Martin Buber, philosopher
Christian von Ehrenfels, philosopher
Herbert Feigl, philosopher (member of the Vienna Circle)
Paul Feyerabend, philosopher (died 1994)
Philipp Frank, philosopher and physicist (member of the Vienna Circle)
Edmund Husserl, philosopher (born in Prossnitz, Austria-Hungary)
Wilhelm Jerusalem, philosopher, born 1854 in Drenitz, died in 1923 in Vienna
Hans Köchler, philosopher (born in Schwaz, 1948)
Georg Kreisel, philosopher and mathematician
Alexius Meinong, philosopher (theory of objects) 1853–1920
Otto Neurath, socialist, economist and philosopher
Karl Popper, philosopher (born in Austria, became British)
Friedrich Waismann, mathematician, philosopher and physicist (member of the Vienna Circle)
Otto Weininger, philosopher
Felix Weltsch, journalist, philosopher, student of Christian von Ehrenfels
Ludwig Wittgenstein, philosopher, born 1889 in Vienna

Physicists, mathematicians and chemists

Emil Artin, mathematician (Artin's conjecture)
Ludwig Boltzmann, physicist, 1844–1906, born in Vienna
Stefan Brünner, physicist, person of the year
Fritjof Capra
Carl Cori, born in Prague, Austria-Hungary, biochemist, Nobel Prize in Physiology or Medicine in 1947
Christian Doppler, physicist, 1803–1853, born in Salzburg (See Doppler effect)
Paul Ehrenfest, physicist and mathematician
Felix Ehrenhaft, maverick physicist, 1879–1952
Josef Finger, physicist and mathematician
Heinz von Foerster, cyberneticist, 1911–2002
Kurt Gödel, mathematician (born in Austria-Hungary, became naturalized U.S. citizen)
Hans Hahn, mathematician (member of the Vienna Circle)
Friedrich Hasenöhrl, physicist
Victor Franz Hess, physicist, Nobel Prize in Physics
Nikolaus Joseph von Jacquin, chemist
Walter Kohn, Nobel Prize in Chemistry 1998
Georg Kreisel, philosopher and mathematician
Richard Kuhn, chemist, Nobel Prize in Chemistry in 1938
Johann Josef Loschmidt, physicist and chemist
Ernst Mach, physicist and philosopher (Mach number)
Lise Meitner, physicist
Richard von Mises, physicist (younger brother of Ludwig von Mises)
John von Neumann, mathematician (Hungarian, Budapest-born)
Wolfgang Pauli, physicist, Nobel Prize in Physics 1945
Max Ferdinand Perutz, chemist, Nobel Prize in Chemistry 1962
Johanna Piesch (1898–1992), physicist, mathematician, pioneer in switching algebra
Fritz Pregl, chemist, Nobel Prize in Chemistry 1923
Erwin Schrödinger, physicist, Nobel Prize in Physics
Heinrich Franz Friedrich Tietze, mathematician
Carl Auer von Welsbach, chemist
Gernot Zippe, physicist (developed Zippe-type centrifuge to extract uranium-235 for nuclear weapons)
Richard Adolf Zsigmondy, chemist, Nobel Prize in Chemistry in 1925 (Hungarian origin)

Physicians

Alfred Adler, psychiatrist, father of Individual Psychology
Hans Asperger, pediatrician who studied autism, person for whom Asperger syndrome is named
Leopold Auenbrugger, physician 1722–1809 (method of percussion)
Robert Bárány, physician, Nobel Prize in Physiology or Medicine
Josef Breuer, physician (forerunner in psychoanalysis)
Ernst von Fleischl-Marxow, physician and physiologist (studies of nerves and the brain)
Viktor Frankl, psychiatrist, father of logotherapy
Sigmund Freud, psychiatrist, father of psychoanalysis
Karl von Frisch, physician, Nobel Prize in Physiology or Medicine
Leo Kanner, child psychiatrist
Karl Landsteiner, physician, serologist, Nobel Prize in Physiology or Medicine, 1886–1943
Otto Loewi, pharmacologist (born in Germany, but spent 40 years (age 25–65) of his life in Austria) Nobel Prize in Physiology or Medicine
Karol Ignacy Lorinser, physician
Franz Mesmer, physician, developed an early form of hypnotism 1734–1815
Paracelsus, (real name: Theophrast von Hohenheim), alchemist and physician
Clemens von Pirquet, pediatrician and scientist in bacteriology and immunology
Wilhelm Reich, psychiatrist, (1897–1957)
Erwin Ringel, Austrian psychiatrist (presuicidal syndrome)
Ignaz Semmelweis, physician (born in Hungary, Austria-Hungary)
Julius Wagner-Jauregg, physician, Nobel Prize in Physiology or Medicine 1927

Psychologists
Paul Watzlawick, communication theory
Sigmund Freud, psychoanalysis

Other scientists
Othenio Abel, paleontologist
Karl von Czyhlarz, Czech-Austrian jurist
Martin Gerzabek, ecologist and soil scientist
Helene Gröger-Wurm, Austrian-born Australian ecologist
Hans Hass, biologist and diving pioneer
Max Hecker (born 1879), Austrian-born Israeli President of the Technion – Israel Institute of Technology
Hans Kelsen, jurist (father of the Austrian constitution)
Konrad Lorenz zoologist, Nobel Prize in Physiology or Medicine
Gregor Mendel, pioneer of genetics
Julius Pokorny, linguist
Rupert Riedl, zoologist
Eric Kandel, neuroscientist

Sports

 Margarete Adler, Olympic bronze swimmer (4x100-meter (m) freestyle relay)
 David Alaba, footballer, winner of 2012–13 UEFA Champions League with FC Bayern Munich
 Felix Baumgartner, world record setting skydiver
 Gunther (wrestler), professional wrestler signed to WWE
 Gerhard Berger, racing driver
 Richard Bergmann, 7-time world table tennis champion, ITTF Hall of Fame
 Albert Bogen (Albert Bógathy), saber fencer, Olympic silver
 Fritzi Burger, figure skater, Olympic 2-time silver, World Championship 2-time silver
 Hans Dobida, inductee into the IIHF Hall of Fame
 Michaela Dorfmeister, alpine skier
 Eva Duldig (born 1938), Austrian-born Australian and Dutch tennis player, author
 Erich Eliskases, chess grandmaster
 Otto Fischer (1901–1941), footballer and coach
 Siegfried Flesch, sabre fencer, Olympic bronze
Marcel Sabitzer, footballer
 Toni Fritsch, soccer and football player who won the Super Bowl in 1972
 Michael Grabner, NHL player
 Ernst Grünfeld, chess grandmaster
 Hans Haas, Olympic champion weightlifter (lightweight), silver
 Tunç Hamarat, correspondence chess world champion (2004)
 Ernst Happel, football player and coach
 Judith Haspel (born "Judith Deutsch"), held every Austrian women's middle and long-distance freestyle record in 1935
 Dr. Otto Herschmann, Olympic 2-silver (in saber fencing/team sabre and 100-m freestyle)
 Hansi Hinterseer, skier, singer, actor, entertainer
 Nickolaus Hirschl, 2-time Olympic bronze wrestler (heavyweight freestyle and Greco-Roman), shot put and discus junior champion, weightlifting junior champion, and pentathlon champion
 Felix Kasper, figure skater, Olympic bronze
 Franz Klammer, Olympic alpine ski champion
Alfred König (1913–1987), Austrian-Turkish Olympic sprinter
 Hans Krankl, football player and coach
 Niki Lauda (1949–2019), Formula One race car driver and aviation entrepreneur
 Hermann Maier, Olympic alpine ski champion
 Alex Manninger, professional footballer for Arsenal F.C., winner of 1997–98 FA Premier League title
 Klara Milch, Olympic bronze swimmer (4x100-m freestyle relay)
 Uberto De Morpurgo (1896–1961), Austrian-born Italian tennis player
 Annemarie Moser-Pröll, alpine skier
 Thomas Muster, tennis champion
 Paul Neumann, Olympic champion swimmer (500 m freestyle)
 Fred Oberlander, wrestler; world champion (freestyle heavyweight); Maccabiah champion
 Eva Pawlik, European figure skating Champion
 Felix Pipes, Olympic silver tennis player (doubles)
 Maxim Podoprigora, Olympic swimmer
 Jakob Pöltl, basketball player; played two seasons of U.S. college basketball at Utah before declaring for the 2016 NBA draft
 Ellen Preis, foil fencer, 3-time world champion (1947, 1949, and 1950), Olympic champion, 17-time Austrian champion
 Herbert Prohaska, football player and coach
 Roland Ratzenberger (1960–1994), race car driver, Formula One driver
 Jochen Rindt (1942–1970), race car driver, Formula One World Champion of 1970
 Toni Sailer, 1956 Olympic Games – won all three gold medals earning himself the Triple Crown of Alpine Skiing; born 1935
 Otto Scheff (born "Otto Sochaczewsky"), Olympic champion swimmer (400 m freestyle) and 2-time bronze (400 m freestyle, 1,500-m freestyle)
 Max Scheuer, footballer; national team
 Werner Schlager, 2003 Table Tennis World Champion
 Carl Schlechter, chess grandmaster
 Gregor Schlierenzauer, Olympic bronze medalist, world and 4 Hills Tournament champion ski jumper
 Heinrich Schönfeld (born 1900), football player
 Matthias Sindelar, footballer
 Wilhelm Steinitz, winner of first-ever world chess championship in 1886
 Josephine Sticker, Olympic bronze swimmer (4x100-m freestyle relay)
 Rudolf Spielmann, chess grandmaster
 Herma Szabo, Olympic and five-time World figure skating champion
 Dominic Thiem, top-20 tennis player and Grand Slam Champion (Men's Singles, US Open 2020)
 Nicole Trimmel, kickboxing champion
 Thomas Vanek, NHL hockey player for the Montreal Canadiens
 Anita Wachter, Olympic alpine ski champion, born 1967 in Schruns
 Otto Wahle, 2-time Olympic silver swimmer (1,000 m freestyle, 200-m obstacle race) and bronze (400 m freestyle); International Swimming Hall of Fame
 Walter Wasservogel, inductee into the IIHF Hall of Fame

Writers

Ingeborg Bachmann, poet, 1926–1973
Hermann Bahr, playwright, novelist 1863–1934
Ludwig Bemelmans, author of the Madeline books, 1898–1962
Thomas Bernhard, dramatist, novelist, poet, 1931–1989, born in Cloister Heerlen, Netherlands
Hermann Broch, novelist
Max Brod, writer, born in Prague, Austria-Hungary, (Bohemia, present-day Czech Republic) 1884–1968, wrote in German
Heimito von Doderer, writer, 1896–1966, born in Hadersdorf-Weidlingau near Vienna
Marie von Ebner-Eschenbach, writer (style: psychological novelist)
Franz Grillparzer, poet, 1791–1872, Vienna
Robert Hamerling, poet 1830–1889
Peter Handke, author, born in 1942 in Griffen (Carinthia)
Hugo von Hofmannsthal, dramatist, writer
Martin Horváth, writer
Franz Kafka, novelist, born in Prague, Austria-Hungary, 1883–1924
Marie-Thérèse Kerschbaumer, born 1936, novelist, poet
Werner Kofler, novelist and dramatist
Karl Gottfried Ritter von Leitner, poet, writer, 1800–1890, born in Graz
Alexander Lernet-Holenia, novelist, poet, dramatist, critic, 1897–1976
Olga Misař, peace activist, feminist, writer, 1876–1950
Robert Musil, writer
Johann Nestroy, famous playwright
Christine Nöstlinger, writer (especially literature for children)
Ferdinand Raimund, writer and dramatist
Christoph Ransmayr, writer
Rainer Maria Rilke, poet and novelist, born in Prague, (Bohemia, present-day Czech Republic) 1875–1926
Peter Rosegger, writer, teacher & Styrian hero and visionary 1843–1918
Joseph Roth, novelist
Arthur Schnitzler, novelist and playwright
Adalbert Stifter, poet and artist (died 1869)
Bertha von Suttner, writer and pacifist Nobel Peace Prize winner, born in Prague, (Bohemia, present-day Czech Republic) 1843–1914
Georg Trakl, poet
Josef Weinheber, poet and essayist
Stefan Zweig, novelist and playwright, 1881–1942

People of the Nazi Party and regime 

Amon Göth, commandant of the Kraków-Płaszów concentration camp and executed Nazi war criminal
 Aribert Heim, physician ("Dr. Death") in the Mauthausen concentration camp
 Adolf Hitler, leader of the Nazi Party and Nazi Germany
 Ernst Kaltenbrunner, high ranking SS officer and Nazi war criminal
 Arthur Seyss-Inquart, Reich Commissioner of the Netherlands

Other notables 

Maria Altmann, niece of Adele Bloch-Bauer
Walter Wolf, business person
Oscar Baumann, explored the interior of German East Africa (present-day Tanzania, Rwanda and Burundi)
Robert Bernardis, resistance fighter during WW2 (July 20 Plot)
Edward Bernays, Austrian-American pioneer in public relations, referred to in his obituary as "the father of public relations".
Adele Bloch-Bauer, subject of famous painting by Gustav Klimt
Josef Fritzl, notorious rapist
Otto von Habsburg, politician, writer, heir to the thrones of Austria-Hungary
Theodor Herzl, "father of Zionism", lived most of his life in Austria
Alois Hitler, father of Adolf Hitler
Klara Hitler, mother of Adolf Hitler
Andreas Hofer, Tyrolian freedom fighter (against Napoleon)
Heinrich Kanner, journalist and editor of the newspaper "Die Zeit" in the k.u.k. Monarchy
Alma Mahler, wife and muse to Mahler, Gropius, Werfel
Andreas Maislinger, founder of the Austrian Holocaust Memorial Service
Erna Patak (1871–1955), Zionist, social worker
Julius von Payer, polar explorer
Wolfgang Puck, celebrity chef and restaurateur
Max Reinhardt, renowned theatre director
Sister Maria Restituta, nun and nurse murdered by the Nazis
Günther Schifter, radio personality
Oskar Schindler, industrialist and famous World War II hero (saved his Jewish factory workers from Auschwitz), born in Svitavy, Moravia, 1908–1974
Otto Skorzeny, Nazi commando (rescuer of Benito Mussolini)
Carl Szokoll, resistance fighter ("saviour of Vienna"), author and film producer
Georg Ludwig von Trapp, head of The Sound of Music family
Franz Viehböck, cosmonaut
Hede von Trapp, painter artist
Karl Weyprecht, polar explorer
Simon Wiesenthal (1908–2005), pre-eminent Nazi hunter

See also
List of Austrian Jews
List of Austrian inventors and discoverers
List of Germans
List of Slovenians
List of Hungarians
List of Croatians
List of Serbs
List of Czechs
List of Slovaks
List of Poles
List of people by nationality

References